Leftover Salmon: Thirty Years of Festival! is a book written by Tim Newby and published by Rowman & Littlefield in 2019.

Overview
Leftover Salmon: Thirty Years of Festival! details the thirty-year history of Leftover Salmon and the influential role they have achieved, despite not always garnering mass recognition.  The book is also a wider examination of the Progressive Bluegrass scene in Colorado that Salmon was a key part of, as well as the development of the 1990s Jam band scene and the off-shoot and evolution into jamgrass.  Salmon's story is told through the personal recollections of its band members, family, friends, former band-mates, managers, and the musicians they have influenced.

Thirty Years of Festival is the second book by author Tim Newby.  His first was 2015's Bluegrass in Baltimore: The Hard Drivin' Sound and its Legacy.  Newby is a teacher as well as serving as a writer for various music publications including Paste Magazine, Relix Magazine, Bluegrass Unlimited, and Honest Tune.

The book was released in February 2019 with a special acoustic tour called the Stories From the Living Room Tour, that featured, "a stripped down version of Leftover Salmon, with a full living room set with lampshades and paintings and all that.”  In between songs the band told stories from their thirty years together.

In December 2019, the book was named "Best Book of 2019" by Festy GoNuts.

Reviews
 Westword, January 3, 2019: "Tim Newby presents an intimate portrait of the Boulder-hatched jamgrass pioneers through the personal recollections of its various members, family, friends, former bandmates, managers and the countless musicians they have influenced.  With nearly three decades under its belt, the band deserves a fitting ode to its accomplishments and longevity, and Newby has done his homework. Thirty Years is sure to please all who have come to appreciate the best of what Leftover Salmon's never-ending festival has to offer."
 Library Journal, January 4, 2019: "Newby expertly and lovingly details the 30-year history of the group...This affectionate work will be manna for jam band fans and interest general readers."
 Festy Go Nuts. January 13, 2019: "In Thirty Years of Festival Newby does a masterful job of not only relaying the story of Leftover Salmon, but of truly capturing their vibe, something not easily accomplished when telling the tale of such an eclectic and original group of musicians."
 Aspen Times, February 13, 2019: "The book is a meticulous piece of reporting -- undergirded by interviews with current and former band members -- and a well-argued piece of long-form music criticism that delineates the band's widespread influence on a generation of bluegrass, acoustic and jam bands."
 Unreal Bluegrass, May 5, 2019: "Leftover Salmon: Thirty Years of Festival! is a very well written account of the creation of Leftover Salmon and its continuation through change and adversity.  Tim's approach is inventive using chapters for each band member as connective tissue to tell the story of the origin and sweeping influence of Leftover Salmon.  It's a very enjoyable read."
 The Bluegrass Situation, July 26, 2019: "In Leftover Salmon: Thirty Years of Festival!, author Tim Newby dives deep into hazy memories and unforgettable highlights, tracing the twisted path that led the band to its current, esteemed place in roots music lore. Across 13 chapters and more than 300 pages Newby coaxes the story from the band’s revolving lineup — deftly treading the line between historian and hardcore fan — and in the end much is revealed of the band’s high-minded beginnings and unshakable ethos, as well as the struggles they’ve seen along the way. And it’s all done with a wild “Festival!” yell running between the lines."
 The Bend Bulletin, August 22, 2019: "The book offers a meticulous history of the band, from its formation out of the ashes of Salmon Heads and the Left Hand String Band, to the death of banjo player Mark Vann in 2002 and the band’s subsequent hiatus and regrouping."
 Grateful Web, October 4, 2019: "The magic of this book is seeing how every person truly played a role within this musical family. . . . [a] fantastic collection of Leftover Salmon’s treasured past."
 Americana UK, October 22, 2019: "There are few better mediums than a book for opening our eyes to new information, for helping us to become a little more knowledgeable about the world around us. I have to put my hand up and say I had never heard of Leftover Salmon before reading this book and I only had sketchy knowledge of the progressive Bluegrass scene, so this book Leftover Salmon: Thirty Years of Festival! has been a real revelation; a window into a different and quite fascinating world."
 Dave Trippin, March 2020: "For jam festival fans, a must-read to get your mind positively twirling like a flaming poi pot in the black of night is the 2019 book, “Leftover Salmon: Thirty Years of Festival!” By Tim Newby, a writer for Paste, and Relix and author of Bluegrass in Baltimore.....Newby takes readers – in chapters featuring a dozen of the guys who have been members of this self-described “Polyethnic Cajun Slamgrass band” – on the long, strange trip that describes how Salmon has proverbially swam upstream, over some waterfalls and all through the night thousands of nights to share the joy of making and sharing music together."

See also
 Music of Colorado
 List of jam bands

References

2019 non-fiction books
American folk music
American non-fiction books
Jam bands
Bluegrass music
Culture of Boulder, Colorado
Music of Colorado
Rowman & Littlefield books